John Beasley (born June 26, 1943) is an American actor. He is known for his roles in the films Rudy (1993), The General's Daughter (1999), The Sum of All Fears (2002), Walking Tall (2004), The Purge: Anarchy (2014), and Sinister 2 (2015).

In 2002, Beasley founded the "John Beasley Theater & Workshop" in Omaha, Nebraska to promote live theater, especially works written by or featuring African-Americans.

Life and career
Beasley was born in Omaha, Nebraska. Beasley did not begin his acting career until his mid-40s. Prior to that he was a railroad man with the Union Pacific Railroad.  He established the John Beasley Theater and Workshop in South Omaha.

He also portrayed General Lasseter in The Sum of All Fears and Reverend C. Charles Blackwell in The Apostle. In 1992 he played Jesse Hall's dad in the movie The Mighty Ducks. He co-starred opposite The Rock in the 2004 remake of Walking Tall.

Beasley has made numerous guest roles on television and has appeared in several TV movies. His most prominent role in a TV series was as Irv Harper in the WB series Everwood.  He most recently appeared in the TV Land sitcom The Soul Man, which aired its fifth and final season in 2016.

Personal life
Beasley's grandson Malik is a professional basketball player for the Los Angeles Lakers.

Filmography

Film

Television

See also
 Theatre in Omaha

References

External links 
 

1943 births
American male stage actors
American male television actors
Living people
Male actors from Omaha, Nebraska
People from Omaha, Nebraska
20th-century American male actors
21st-century American male actors